Marius Lode (born 11 March 1993) is Norwegian professional footballer who plays as a defender for Bodø/Glimt.

Club career 
Lode was born in Kvernaland, and started his career in local Frøyland IL. His grandfather comes from Germany.

He made his senior debut for Bryne FK on 9 April 2012 against Strømmen; Bryne won that match 3–1. He played as a defender for Bryne until May 2015, when he was banned from playing professional football, due to a positive drug test, that showed use of Ritalin, a medicinal stimulant drug consisting of methylphenidate. Lode tested positive on Ritalin in May 2015, before a match against Sogndal. He stated he had used Ritalin as performance-enhancing drug before university exams. Lode was banned from playing football in ten months and lost most of the 2016 season. During the ban, he worked in a local restaurant in Bryne and maintained his physique, until he was allowed to train with Bryne FK in October 2016.

Lode signed for Bodø/Glimt before the season in  2017, playing 29 out of 30 matches that season. Bodø/Glimt won the Norwegian first division in 2017 and was promoted to Eliteserien. Before the  2018 season, some Norwegian football clubs were interested in buying Lode, including the relegated teams Viking and Aalesund.

In January 2022, 2. Bundesliga club Schalke 04 announced the signing of Lode on a two-and-a-half year contract. He was released by Schalke on 16 August 2022.

On 31 August 2022, Lode signed for his old club Bodø/Glimt on a contract lasting until the end of 2025 sesason, with an option for another year.

International career 
Lode made his debut for Norway national team on 24 March 2021 in a World Cup qualifier against Gibraltar.

Career statistics

Club

International

Honours 
Bodø/Glimt
Eliteserien: 2020, 2021

Schalke 04
2. Bundesliga: 2021–22

External links

References 

1993 births
Living people
Norwegian people of French descent
People from Time, Norway
Norwegian footballers
Association football defenders
Norway international footballers
Norway under-21 international footballers
Norwegian First Division players
Eliteserien players
2. Bundesliga players
Bryne FK players
FK Bodø/Glimt players
FC Schalke 04 players
Norwegian expatriate footballers
Expatriate footballers in Germany
Norwegian expatriate sportspeople in Germany
Sportspeople from Rogaland